Helinus is a genus of flowering plants in the family Rhamnaceae. They are native to tropical and subtropical regions of Africa and Asia, and may be trees, climbing shrubs or lianas. They are unarmed and the branches have coiled tendrils. The alternate leaves have entire margins, and pinnately arranged venation.

Species
The species include: 
Helinus integrifolius (Lam.) Kuntze – southern Africa
Helinus lanceolatus Brandis – Pakistan, western Himalayas, India
Helinus mystacinus (Aiton) E.Mey. ex Steud. – eastern Africa
Helinus spartioides Schinz ex Engl. – southwestern Africa

References

External links

Rhamnaceae
Rhamnaceae genera